Watten may refer to:

Places
 Watten, Nord, a commune in the Nord département of France
 Blockhaus d'Éperlecques or Watten bunker, intended to be a launching facility for the V-2 ballistic missile
 Watten, Highland, a village in Caithness, in the Highland local government area of Scotland

People
 Barrett Watten (born 1948), American poet connected to the Language poets
 Dustin Watten (born 1986), American volleyball player

Games 
 Watten (card game), a card game popular in Bavaria and Austria

See also
 Watton (disambiguation)
 Wattens, a market community in Austria